The Premio Valle-Inclán is a literary translation prize. It is awarded by the Society of Authors (London) for the best English translation of a work of Spanish literature. It is named after Ramón del Valle-Inclán. The prize money is GBP 2,000.

Past winners
Source:

2021 

 Winner: Fionn Petch for a translation of A Musical Offering by Luis Sagasti (Charco Press)
 Runner up: Lisa Dillman for a translation of A Luminous Republic by Andrés Barba (Granta)

Shortlist: 

 Annie McDermott for a translation of Dead Girls by Selva Almada (Charco Press)
 Sophie Hughes for a translation of Hurricane Season by Fernanda Melchor (Fitzcarraldo Editions)
 Christina MacSweeney for a translation of Ramifications by Daniel Saldaña París (Charco Press)

2020 (presented 2021) 

 Winner: Katherine Silver for a translation of The Word of the Speechless by Julio Ramon Ribeyro (New York Review Books)
 Runner-up: Anne McLean for a translation of Lord of All the Dead by Javier Cercas (MacLehose Press)

Shortlist: 

 Richard Gwyn for a translation of Impossible Loves by Darío Jaramillo (Carcanet Poetry) 

 Abigail Parry and Serafina Vick for a translation of A Little Body are Many Parts by Legna Rodríguez Iglesias (Bloodaxe Books and the Poetry Translation Centre)
 Margaret Jull Costa and Sophie Hughes for a translation of Mac and His Problem by Enrique Vila-Matas (Vintage, PRH)
 Megan McDowell for a translation of Mouthful of Birds by Samanta Schweblin (Oneworld)

2019 (presented 2020) 

 Winner: Jessica Sequeira for a translation of Land of Smoke by Sara Gallardo (Pushkin Press)
 Runner-Up: Sophie Hughes for a translation of The Remainder by Alia Trabucco Zeran (And Other Stories)
Shortlisted:
Nick Caistor for a translation of Springtime in a Broken Mirror by Mario Benedetti (Penguin Classics)
Charlotte Coombe for a translation of Fish Soup by Margarita García Robayo (Charco Press)
 William Gregory for a translation of The Oberon Anthology of Contemporary Spanish Plays by Borja Ortiz de Gondra, Blanca Doménech, Victor Sánches Rodríguez, Vanessa Montford, and Julio Escalada (Oberon Books)

2018 (presented 2019)
 Winner: Megan McDowell for Seeing Red by Lina Meruane (Atlantic)

 Runner-up: Daniel Hahn for In the Land of Giants by Gabi Martínez (Scribe)

Shortlisted: 

 Simon Deefholts and Kathryn Phillips-Miles for Inventing Love by José Ovejero (Peter Owen Publishers); 
 Sarah Moses and Carolina Orloff for Die, My Love by Ariana Harwicz (Charco Press)

2017 (presented 2018)
 Winner: Margaret Jull Costa for On the Edge by Rafael Chirbes (Harvill Secker)
 Commendation: Rosalind Harvey for I'll Sell You a Dog by Juan Pablo Villalobos (And Other Stories)

2016 (presented 2017)
 Winner: Christina MacSweeney for The Story of My Teeth by Valeria Luiselli (Granta)

2015 (presented 2016)
 Winner: Anne McLean for Outlaws by Javier Cercas (Bloomsbury)
Commended: Margaret Jull Costa for her translation of Tristana by Benito Pérez Galdós (New York Review Books)

2014
 Winner: Nick Caistor for An Englishman in Madrid, by Eduardo Mendoza (MacLehose Press)
Commended: Margaret Jull Costa for her translation of The Infatuations by Javier Marías (Hamish Hamilton)

2013
 Winner: Frank Wynne for The Blue Hour by Alonso Cueto (Heinemann)
 Runner-up: Nick Caistor and Lorenza García for Traveller of the Century by Andrés Neuman (Pushkin Press)
 Runner-up: Anne McLean for The Sound of Things Falling by Juan Gabriel Vásquez (Bloomsbury)

2012
 Winner: Peter Bush for Exiled from Almost Everywhere by Juan Goytisolo (Dalkey Archive Press)
 Runner-up: Margaret Jull Costa for Seven Houses in France by Bernardo Atxaga (Harvill Secker)

2011
 Winner: Frank Wynne for Kamchatka by Marcelo Figueras (Atlantic)
 Runner-up: Margaret Jull Costa for The Sickness by Alberto Barrera Tyszka (Maclehose Press)

2010
 Margaret Jull Costa for Your Face Tomorrow 3: Poison, Shadow and Farewell by Javier Marías (Chatto) 
 Christopher Johnson for the Selected Poetry of Francisco de Quevedo (University of Chicago Press).

2009
 Winner: Margaret Jull Costa for The Accordionist's Son by Bernardo Atxaga (Harvill Secker)
 Runner up: Edith Grossman for Happy Families by Carlos Fuentes (Bloomsbury)

2008
 Winner: Nick Caistor for The Past by Alan Pauls (Harvill Secker)
 John Dent-Young for Selected Poems by Luis de Góngora (The University of Chicago Press)

2007
 Winner: Nick Caistor for The Sleeping Voice by Dulce Chacón (Harvill Secker/Alfaguara)
 Runner up: John Cullen for Lies by Enrique de Hériz (Weidenfeld/Edhasa)

2006
 Winner: Margaret Jull Costa for Your Face Tomorrow 1: Fever and Spear by Javier Marías (Chatto & Windus)
 Runner up: Sonia Soto for The Oxford Murders by Guillermo Martinez (Abacus)

2005
 Winner: Chris Andrews for Distant Star by Roberto Bolaño (Harvill)
 Runner up: Margaret Jull Costa for The Man of Feeling by Javier Marías (Harvill)

2004
 Winner: Anne McLean for Soldiers of Salamis by Javier Cercas (Bloomsbury)

2003
 Winner: Sam Richard for Not Only Fire by Benjamin Prado (Faber and Faber)

2002
 Winner: John D. Rutherford for Don Quixote by Miguel de Cervantes (Penguin)
 Runner up: Margaret Sayers Peden for Portrait in Sepia by Isabel Allende (Flamingo)

2001
 Winner: Timothy Adès for Homer in Cuernavaca by Alfonso Reyes (Edinburgh University Press)
 Runner up: Edith Grossman for The Messenger by Mayra Montero (Harvill)

2000
 Winner: Sonia Soto for Winter in Lisbon by Antonio Muñoz Molina (Granta)
 Runner up: Margaret Sayers Peden for Daughter of Fortune by Isabel Allende (Flamingo)

1999
 Winner: Don Share for I Have Lots of Heart by Miguel Hernández (Bloodaxe)

1997
 Winner: Peter Bush for The Marx Family Saga by Juan Goytisolo (Faber)

References

External links
 Premio Valle Inclan Past Winners

Translation awards